"V" (Hangul: 브이) is a song by South Korean singer and actress Lee Jung-hyun. It was released digitally on July 22, and a special edition CD and DVD was released on August 5.

Charts

Track listing

References

2013 songs
Korean-language songs